Lithilaria ossicolor, the bone moth, is a moth of the family Erebidae first described by Rudolph Rosenstock in 1885. It is found in Australia.

The wingspan is about 30 mm.

References

Hypeninae